Barzuhandan (also Romanized as Barzūhandān; also known as Barzūkhandān) is a village in Jirdeh Rural District, in the Central District of Shaft County, Gilan Province, Iran. At the 2006 census, its population was 556, in 125 families.

References 

Populated places in Shaft County